Blackhawk Township is located in Rock Island County, Illinois. As of the 2010 census, its population was 10,019 and it contained 4,563 housing units. Blackhawk Township changed its name from Camden County on October 1, 1857.

Quad City International Airport is partially within the township.

Geography

Demographics

References

External links

City-data.com
Illinois State Archives

Townships in Rock Island County, Illinois
Townships in Illinois
1857 establishments in Illinois
Populated places established in 1857